Wansbrough may refer to:

Arthur Wansbrough (1877–1949), Australian politician
Charles Wansbrough (1875–1939), Australian politician
Henry Wansbrough, British biblical scholar and monk of Ampleforth
John Wansbrough (1928–2002), American historian, working at SOAS, specialising in Islamic origins
Owen Wansbrough-Jones (1906–1983), British academic chemist and soldier